The Joondalup line is a commuter rail service in Western Australia, linking the Perth central business district (CBD) with the metropolitan area's north-western suburbs. The service is operated on the Northern Suburbs Railway by Transperth Train Operations, a division of the Public Transport Authority, and is part of the Transperth network. The service is currently, being extended to Yanchep as part of the Yanchep Rail Extension project, and may be renamed once the extension to Yanchep is completed.

Construction of the infrastructure for the service began on 14 November 1989. It opened between Perth station and Joondalup station on 20 December 1992, albeit with only Perth, Leederville, Edgewater and Joondalup stations operational. The remaining stations began operating on 21 March 1993. The Joondalup line initially continued as the Armadale line. The service has been extended beyond the original terminus at Joondalup several times since: an extension to Currambine opened on 8 August 1993; an extension to Clarkson opened on 4 October 2004; and an extension to Butler station opened on 21 September 2014. The railway for the service has also been realigned through the Perth CBD, as part of the construction of the Mandurah line: on 15 October 2007, the southern end began operating through tunnels under the CBD, terminating at Elizabeth Quay; and on 24 December 2007, the service began to continue south as the Mandurah line service. In 2019, work commenced to extend the service to Yanchep as part of the Yanchep Rail Extension project, and may be renamed once the extension to Yanchep is completed . This is the final proposed extension of the service.

Trains take 38 minutes to get from Perth Underground station to Butler station. The service is the second busiest on the Transperth network, with 11,885,779 boardings in the 2020–21 financial year, and 16,531,788 boardings in the 2018–19 financial year. Headways are at least every 15 minutes during the day, rising to every 5 minutes on parts during peak time.

History

Construction of the railway line commenced with Premier Peter Dowding driving the first spike on 14 November 1989. The line to Joondalup was opened by Premier Carmen Lawrence on 20 December 1992. Initially only Leederville, Edgewater and Joondalup stations were opened with the remaining stations opened as completed for a full service to commence on 21 March 1993. A realignment of the entire Transperth bus system was undertaken whereby the new railway stations became bus interchanges. On 8 August 1993, the line was extended to Currambine.

Initially, service frequencies were similar to those for the Fremantle line as lower passenger numbers were anticipated; however, overcrowding saw the doubling of services between Perth and Whitfords on weekdays. Services were reverted to Fremantle line frequencies between 09:00 and 14:00 on 28 June 2009 due to low passenger numbers on those services.

On 4 October 2004, the line was extended to Clarkson as part of the New MetroRail project. Nowergup depot opened at the same time. On 29 January 2005, Greenwood was opened to alleviate pressure at the adjacent Warwick and Whitfords stations.

On 8 August 2005, the service, which previously continued south from Perth station onto the Armadale line, was curtailed at Perth and no longer provided a through service. On 15 October 2007, Joondalup line trains began running to Perth Underground and Elizabeth Quay stations via new tunnels under central Perth.

On 23 December 2007, the opening of the Mandurah line resulted in Joondalup services operating through to Mandurah. On 21 September 2014, the service was extended to Butler.

Future

Yanchep extension

In the 2017 Western Australian state budget, $441 million was allocated to build the extension, with preparation works starting in January 2020 and bulk earthworks . When the extension opens, a journey time of 49 minutes is envisioned from Yanchep to the CBD, with up to 13,500 people expected to use the service every day.

At the 2021–22 State Budget, it was announced that completion of the Yanchep rail extension had been deferred by 12 months, as a result of Western Australia's skills shortage. This was alongside the deferment of 15 other state government infrastructure projects. The revised opening date is late 2023.

Additional stations
There are provisions for a special events station to be built to service Arena Joondalup. However, there are currently no plans for that to go ahead.

Description
During hot weather, the tracks can distort. As a result, train speeds are reduced by approximately  when the air temperature is above , and by an additional  when the air temperature is above .

The Transperth network currently uses fixed block signalling and automatic train protection, which stops trains that pass a red signal and slows trains that drive too fast. These systems will be replaced by an automatic train control system, likely a communications-based train control system. The new systems are planned to be in place on the Joondalup line by June 2029, and will allow up to at least 30 trains per hour to use the line.

Route

At its southern end, the service (travelling north) begins as a continuation of the Mandurah line at Elizabeth Quay and (travelling south) ends as a continuation of the Mandurah line at Perth Underground. The  section through the Perth CBD runs underground, passing underneath the Fremantle line at Yagan Square which at their crossing also runs underground. The service surfaces and enters the median of the Mitchell Freeway. It continues north along the freeway until Butler, only exiting the median to pass through the centre of Joondalup, the major suburban centre fed by the service. At Butler, the service veers off to the west, terminating at Butler railway station.

Stations

Service
The Joondalup line has three stopping patterns in addition to all stops services. All stops services run every 15 minutes during the day Monday to Sunday, every 10 minutes during the weekday peak, and every half an hour or every hour at night. In addition, there is the W stopping pattern, which stops at all stations between Elizabeth Quay and Whitfords, terminating there. This runs every 10 minutes during the weekday peak, so stations between Perth and Whitfords have a service every 5 minutes in each direction during peak. There is also the K stopping pattern, which stops at all stations between Perth and Clarkson, terminating there. This runs every 10 minutes towards Perth before peak instead of W pattern services, and every 10 minutes towards Clarkson after peak instead of W pattern services. The other stopping pattern is the P stopping pattern, which runs from Whitfords to Perth Station, instead of Perth Underground. There is one P stopping pattern service per weekday, departing Whitfords at the end of the morning peak.

Rolling stock

The Joondalup line is operated exclusively by Transperth B-series trains, which are three cars long each, and are typically coupled together to form six car sets. Previously, there were Transperth A-series trains operating on the line. As more B-series trains were delivered, A-series trains were moved from the Joondalup and Mandurah lines to the other lines on the network. Starting in 2022, Transperth C-series trains will be operating on the Joondalup line. The higher number of doors will help reduce dwell times at stations, making 18 trains per hour possible. B-series trains will be gradually transferred onto the other lines to replace A-series trains. By about 2031, all trains on the Joondalup line will be C-series trains.

In May 2002, the government signed a contract with EDI Rail–Bombardier Transportation for the delivery and maintenance of 31 three car B-series trains, and the construction of the Nowergup depot. In December 2006, the government signed another contract for 15 more three car B-series trains. The first of these additional railcars were delivered in 2009, allowing several A-series trains to be moved from the Joondalup and Mandurah lines to other lines on the network, and for frequencies to increase on most lines, including the Joondalup line. In July 2011, the government ordered 15 more three car B-series trains. In August 2012, this order was increased by two, to cater for the opening of Aubin Grove station on the Mandurah line. In November 2012, this order was increased by five, bringing the total order to 22 three car trains. By the final delivery from that order, all trains operating on the Joondalup and Mandurah lines were B-series trains. In December 2019, the government signed a contract with Alstom for the construction of 41 six car C-series trains. These trains are expected to be delivered starting in 2022.

Most trains on the Joondalup line are stored and cleaned at Nowergup depot. There is also Mandurah depot on the southern end of the Mandurah line, which can store and clean a smaller number of trains. Maintenance occurs at Nowergup depot.

Patronage
Below is the annual patronage of the Joondalup line from July 2010 to June 2021. Figures are provided as total boardings, which includes all fare-paying boardings and free travel on stations within the free transit zones as well as transfers between stations. The figures for rail replacement and special events services are not included in the total.

References

External links

 
Railway lines in Perth, Western Australia
Railway lines opened in 1992
3 ft 6 in gauge railways in Australia
Railway lines in highway medians